Islamic World Science Citation Database (ISC) is a citation index established by the Iranian Ministry of Science, Research and Technology after it was approved by the Organisation of the Islamic Conference.  It only indexes journals from the Islamic world.

It was announced in Baku, Azerbaijan during the Fourth Islamic Conference of the Ministers of Higher Education and Scientific Research held in October 2008.  It is managed by the Islamic World Science Citation Center, located in Shiraz.

In 2009, ISC partnered with Scopus that allows ISC's publications to be indexed in Scopus.

See also
 Academic publishing
 List of academic databases and search engines
 Impact factor

References

External links 
 

Bibliographic databases and indexes
Online databases
Citation indices
Research management
Databases in Iran
Science and technology in Iran
2000s in Islam